Porca Miseria is a 1951 Italian comedy film directed by Giorgio Bianchi.

Plot
Two friends, Giacomino and Carletto, have no job and no money and are looking for a job, or any device that will help them to meet expenses and especially will give them the opportunity to fill their stomachs. After several misadventures, they seem reduced to despair, but a ray of hope appears on the horizon. The two learn of a variety show they could participate in, if only they had a companion, a girl with a nice pair of legs. Their early searches are unsuccessful, but then their salvation appears in the guise of a poor and beautiful roommate whom the landlady kicked out for not paying the rent. The trio is hired, but because of the ineptitude of Jack, the show ends in disaster and the two friends, hungrier than ever, must flee with their new partner. In the course of their further adventures, the two friends fall in love with the girl and each believes he is the favorite. They are both greatly disappointed when they come to understand that another, third man, is the one who makes the girl happy.

Cast
Carlo Croccolo : Carletto
Francesco Golisano : Giacomino
Isa Barzizza : Jenny
Giacomo Rondinella : Mario
Carlo Campanini : Agenore
Riccardo Billi : Trafficone 
Mario Riva : Count Cerri
Virgilio Riento :  Butler
Nyta Dover : Emma
Tina Pica : Rosa
Dina Perbellini : Miss Moretti
 Gigi Schneider : Lella's Boyfriend

See also
Those Two (1935)

References

External links

Porca miseria at Variety Distribution

1951 films
Films based on works by Eduardo De Filippo
Italian comedy films
1950s Italian-language films
Films with screenplays by Ruggero Maccari
Remakes of Italian films
1951 comedy films
Italian black-and-white films
1950s Italian films